Curran is a village in Curran Township, Sangamon County, Illinois (United States). It was incorporated in 2005 and had an estimated population of 212 in 2010.

Curran is located a few miles west of Springfield and is part of the Springfield Metropolitan Statistical Area.

Geography

Demographics

Local government
Curran is governed by a typical village administration consisting of a Village President and six Trustees. The first village-wide election took place in April 2007. Brian Markley is the current Village President.

The Village Clerk and Treasurer are appointed.

References

External links
Village of Curran – Official site.
Sangamon County – Official site.

Villages in Sangamon County, Illinois
Villages in Illinois
Springfield metropolitan area, Illinois
Populated places established in 2005